Leofric Matthew Hay-Dinwoody was an eminent Anglican priest in the first half of the 20th century.  He was successively Precentor  of Inverness Cathedral, Rector of Holy Trinity, Elgin and Dean of Moray, Ross and Caithness from 1925 until 1932.

Notes

Scottish Episcopalian clergy
Deans of Moray, Ross and Caithness